The 1988 CA-TennisTrophy was a men's tennis tournament played on indoor carpet courts at the Wiener Stadthalle in Vienna, Austria that was part of the 1988 Nabisco Grand Prix. It was the 14th edition of the tournament and ran from 17 October through 24 October 1988. Unseeded Horst Skoff won the singles title.

Finals

Singles

 Horst Skoff defeated  Thomas Muster 4–6, 6–3, 6–4, 6–2
 It was Skoff's 2nd title of the year and the 3rd of his career.

Doubles

 Alex Antonitsch /  Balázs Taróczy defeated  Kevin Curren /  Tomáš Šmíd 4–6, 6–3, 7–6
 It was Antonitsch's only title of the year and the 2nd of his career. It was Taróczy's only title of the year and the 38th of his career.

References

External links
 ATP tournament profile
 ITF tournament edition details

 
Vienna Open